Gimreka is a settlement in Podporozhsky District, Leningrad Oblast in Russia.

It is mentioned in 1496 in the Oshta churchyard as the village of Na Khem River, the Gimoretsk patrimony of the Antonyev Monastery.

References

Cities and towns in Leningrad Oblast
Podporozhsky District
Petrozavodsky Uyezd

 Partially run by Germany in 1941-44.